Louis Payette (25 December 1854 – 19 March 1932) was a Canadian construction contractor and politician, the Mayor of Montreal, Quebec between 1908 and 1910.

Payette was educated at the Académie des Frères des écoles chrétiennes, focusing on business studies before beginning his career in the construction industry.

From 1902 to 1908, he was a city councillor for the Saint-Louis ward before his two years as Mayor.

External links
Louis Payette at City of Montreal

1854 births
1932 deaths
Businesspeople from Montreal
Mayors of Montreal